Events from the year 1716 in Ireland.

Incumbent
Monarch: George I

Events
June 20 – acts of the Parliament of Ireland for:
Confiscating the estates of James Butler, 2nd Duke of Ormonde and vesting them in the Crown, and abolishing the county palatine of Tipperary.
Drainage and navigation of the River Shannon.
The titles Viscount Molesworth and Baron Philipstown, of Swords in the County of Dublin, are created in the Peerage of Ireland for Robert Molesworth.

Arts and literature
November 12 – Johann Sigismund Kusser (Cousser) is appointed "Master of the Music, attending His Majesties State in Ireland".
Sarah Butler's Irish Tales is published in London.

Births

November 1 – Tichborne Aston, politician (d. 1748)
William Fisher, politician in Nova Scotia (d. 1777)
Charles Tottenham, politician (d. 1795)
Approximate date
James Daly, politician (d. 1769)
Richard Tyrell, naval officer (d. 1766)

Deaths
August 6 – Paul Davys, 1st Viscount Mount Cashell, nobleman (b. c. 1670)
October 17 – Henry Folliott, 3rd Baron Folliott, nobleman, landowner and politician.
Patrick Donnelly, Roman Catholic Bishop of Dromore and poet (b. 1650)
Garret Morphey, painter (b. c. 1650)
1716 or 1718 – Ruaidhrí Ó Flaithbheartaigh, historian (b. 1629)

References

 
Ireland